The rheas, also known as ñandus or South American ostriches, are large ratites (flightless birds without a keel on their sternum bone) in the order Rheiformes, native to South America, distantly related to the ostrich and emu. Most taxonomic authorities recognize two extant species: the greater or American rhea (Rhea americana), and the lesser or Darwin's rhea (Rhea pennata). The International Union for Conservation of Nature (IUCN) classifies the puna rhea as another species instead of a subspecies of the lesser rhea. The IUCN currently rates the greater and puna rheas as near-threatened in their native ranges, while Darwin's rhea is of least concern. In addition, a feral population of the greater rhea in Germany appears to be growing, though control efforts are underway, and seem to be succeeding in controlling the birds' population growth.

Etymology
The name "rhea" was used in 1752 by Paul Möhring and adopted as the English common name. Möhring named the rhea after the Greek Titan Rhea, whose Ancient Greek name is thought to come from  "ground". This was fitting with the rhea being a flightless ground bird.

Taxonomy and systematics

The genus Rhea was introduced by the French zoologist Mathurin Jacques Brisson in 1760 with the greater rhea (Rhea americana) as the type species.

Extant species
The genus contains two extant species and eight subspecies, although one subspecies is disputed:

Rhea pennata was not always in the genus Rhea. In 2008, the SACC, the last holdout, approved the merging of the genera, Rhea and Pterocnemia on August 7, 2008. This merging of genera leaves only the genus Rhea. A former fourth species of rhea, Rhea nana, was described by Lydekker in 1894 based on a single egg found in Patagonia, but today no major authorities consider it valid.

Fossils
 †R. anchorenense (Ameghino & Rusconi 1932) [Rhea americana anchorenense Amcghino & Rusconi 1932]
 †R. fossilis (Moreno & Mercerat 1891) [Pterocnemia fossilis (Moreno & Mercerat 1891); Rhea pampeana (Moreno & Mercerat 1891)]
 †R. mesopotamica (Agnolín & Noriega 2012) [Pterocnemia mesopotamica Agnolín & Noriega 2012]
 †R. subpampeana Moreno & Mercerat 1891

Description

Rheas are large, flightless birds with grey-brown plumage, long legs and long necks, similar to an ostrich. Their wings are large for a flightless bird and are spread while running, to act like sails. Unlike most birds, rheas have only three toes. Their tarsus has 18 to 22 horizontal plates on the front of it. They also store urine separately in an expansion of the cloaca.

Distribution and habitat

Rheas are from South America only and are limited within the continent to Argentina, Bolivia, Brazil, Chile, Paraguay, Peru and Uruguay. They are grassland birds and both species prefer open land. The greater rheas live in open grasslands, pampas and chaco woodlands. They prefer to breed near water and prefer lowlands, seldom going above .

Feral populations in Europe 
A small population of rheas has emerged in Mecklenburg-Western Pomerania, northeastern Germany, after several couples escaped from an exotic meat farm near Lübeck in the late 1990s. Contrary to expectations, the large birds adapted well to conditions in the German countryside. A monitoring system has been in place since 2008.

The population grew steadily for several years. By autumn 2018 their numbers had greatly increased to about 600. As such, local farmers claim increasing damage to their fields, and some biologists say the rheas pose a growing risk to local wildlife. Still protected by German natural conservation law, a local discussion has begun regarding how to handle the situation. Eventually, Mecklenburg-Western Pomerania's government allowed limited hunting of the birds, explicitly to just reduce the population's growth and not to wipe them out. At this point, it was generally agreed that the rheas should be allowed to stay in the region. By spring 2021, just 247 rheas were counted; this development was attributed to both the hunting as well as the increased caution of the animals. Several had begun to avoid humans more than previously, and retreated into the woods.

There also appears to be a small population of wild rheas in the United Kingdom. In March 2021, a group of about 20 rheas were reported to be running free on a residential estate in Hertfordshire. Local police were unable to identify any owner, so the assumption was that they were wild birds. Once caught, authorities intend to place them in a suitable nature reserve to allow them to develop as a colony.

Behavior

Individual and flocking
Rheas tend to be silent birds, with the exception being when they are chicks or when the male is seeking a mate. During breeding season, the male will attempt to attract females by calling. This call is a loud booming noise. While calling like this, they will lift the front of their body, ruffle their plumage, all while keeping their neck stiff. They will then extend and raise their wings, and run short distances, alternating with their wings. He may then single out a female and walk alongside or in front of her with a lowered head and spread wings. If the female notices him, then he will wave his neck back and forth in a figure eight. Finally, a female may offer herself and copulation will commence.

During the non-breeding season they may form flocks of between 20 and 25 birds, although the lesser rhea forms smaller flocks than this. When in danger they flee in a zigzag course, using first one wing then the other, similar to a rudder. During breeding season the flocks break up.

Diet
For the most part, rheas are herbivorous and prefer broad-leafed plants but they also eat fruits, seeds and roots, as well as insects such as grasshoppers and small reptiles and rodents. Young rheas generally eat only insects for the first few days. Outside of the breeding season they gather in flocks and feed with deer and cattle.

Reproduction
Rheas are polygamous, with males courting between two and twelve females. After mating, the male builds a nest, in which each female lays her eggs in turn. The nest consists of a simple scrape in the ground, lined with grass and leaves. The male incubates from ten to sixty eggs. The male will use a decoy system and place some eggs outside the nest and sacrifice these to predators, so that they do not attempt to get inside the nest. The male may use another subordinate male to incubate his eggs, while he finds another harem to start a second nest. The chicks hatch within 36 hours of each other. Right before hatching, the chicks begin to whistle. The females, meanwhile, may move on and mate with other males. While caring for the young, the males will charge at any perceived threat that approach the chicks including female rheas and humans. The young reach full adult size in about six months but do not breed until they reach two years of age.

Status and conservation
The numbers of both the greater and puna rhea are decreasing as their habitats are shrinking. Both are considered near threatened by the IUCN. The IUCN also states that they are both approaching vulnerable status. The lesser rhea is classified as least concern.

Human interaction

Rheas have many uses in South America. Feathers are used for feather dusters, skins are used for cloaks or leather, and their meat is a staple to many people.

Gauchos traditionally hunt rheas on horseback, throwing bolas or boleadoras—a throwing device consisting of three balls joined by rope—at their legs, which immobilises the bird. The rhea is pictured on Argentina's 1-centavo coin minted in 1987, and on the Uruguayan 5-peso coin.

Notes

References

External links

Rhea videos on the Internet Bird Collection

Rheidae
Ratites
Domesticated birds
Flightless birds
Higher-level bird taxa restricted to the Neotropics
Bird genera
Birds of South America
Extant Late Pleistocene first appearances
Taxa named by Mathurin Jacques Brisson